Success Story was a 1932 Broadway three-act drama written by John Howard Lawson, 
produced by the Group Theatre and staged by Lee Strasberg with Scenic design by
Mordecai Gorelik. It ran for 121 performances from September 26, 1932, to January 1933 at the 
Maxine Elliott's Theatre. This was actor Russell Collins' Broadway debut. Actors
William Challee and Ruth Nelson were a married couple.

Plot

In 1928 young Sol Ginsberg joins a Madison Avenue advertising agency. Formerly a radical idealist his 
philosophy changes to money as being the culmination of the American Dream. He starts to compromise his former 
ideals to advance his career, risking losing the faith of his childhood sweetheart and in himself.

Cast

 Luther Adler as Sol Ginsberg	
 Stella Adler as Sarah Glassman	
 Morris Carnovsky as Rufus Sonnenberg	
 William Challee as Jeffery Haliburton	
 Russell Collins as Harry Fisher	
 Ruth Nelson as Dinah McCabe	
 Art Smith as Marcus Turner	
 Franchot Tone as Raymond Merritt
 Margaret Barker as Miss Farley
 Dorothy Patten as	Agnes Carter

References
 
 REGroup

External links 
 

1932 plays
Broadway plays
Plays set in New York City